The Commonwealth of Municipalities of the Vall d'Albaida is a  of the  of the Vall d'Albaida, Spain.

Its president is Vicent Gomar Moscardó and its vice-president is Josep Antoni Albert i Quilis.

Function 
The commonwealth is responsible for promoting and coordinating the proper function of the following activities throughout the Vall d'Albaida: 
 Promote cultural activities (Such as the Aplec of Dance of the Vall d'Albaida)
 Ensure the proper function of wastewater treatment facilities
 Provide animal shelters
 Tax management
 Ensure clean roads and waste disposal
 Healthcare
 Social Services
 Tourism

Municipalities 
The towns and cities that form the Commonwealth are:
 Atzeneta d'Albaida
 Agullent
 Albaida
 Alfarrasí
 Aielo de Malferit
 Aielo de Rugat
 Bèlgida
 Bellús
 Beniatjar
 Benicolet
 Benigànim
 Benissoda
 Benissuera
 Bocairent
 Bufalí
 Carrícola
 Castelló de Rugat
 Quatretonda
 Fontanars dels Alforins
 Guadasséquies
 Llutxent
 Montaverner
 Montitxelvo
 L'Olleria
 Ontinyent
 Otos
 El Palomar
 Pinet
 La Pobla del Duc
 El Ràfol de Salem
 Rugat
 Salem
 Sempere
 Terrateig

References

External links 
 Official webpage of the Commonwealth (in Valencian/Catalan and Spanish)
 Portal of the General Direction of Local Administration of the Generalitat Valenciana (in Valencian/Catalan and Spanish)